Thryssa encrasicholoides, the false baelama anchovy or New Jersey anchovy, is a species of ray-finned fish in the family Engraulidae. It is found in the all marine, brackish and freshwater systems. It is closely related to Thryssa baelama, where the two different only by small structural aspects such as more caudal vertebrae and 1 or 2 keeled scutes without arms.

Description
It is a small schooling fish found in depth of 20-50m. Maximum length do not exceed 10.7 cm. The fish lack dorsal soft rays and only present 24 to 28 anal soft rays.

Distribution
Spreads all along the Indo-Pacific oceans from India, Sri Lanka, to Indonesia, the Philippines and northern Australia.

See also
List of common commercial fish of Sri Lanka

References

WoRMS
Anchovy

Fish of Thailand
Taxa named by Pieter Bleeker
Fish described in 1852
encrasicholoides